Lost in the Game may refer to:

 Lost in the Game (film), a 2005 American drama film
 Lost in the Game (soundtrack), the soundtrack to the 2005 drama film
 Lost in the Game (album), a 2012 album by Kid606